Karpowership is the builder, operator, and owner of a fleet of powerships. Since 2010, 25 powerships have been completed with their total installed capacity exceeding 6,000 MW.

Karpowership executes all its activities in-house, including design, construction, site preparation, commissioning, fuel supply and electricity delivery.

Powership 
Powerships are barge- or ship-mounted floating power plants, and they can operate on heavy fuel oil (HFO), diesel fuel, and/or natural gas. Karpowership's powerships are available under electricity-generation services contracts, power-rental contracts, energy-conversion works contracts or power-purchase agreements.

In 2007, Karpowership developed a project named "Power of Friendship", which supplies electricity to shortage-stricken countries in the Middle East, Africa and Asia.

The freighter Melpomeni was acquired in 2009 by Karpowership with the purpose to turn her into a floating power plant sailing under the Liberian flag. She was renamed Karadeniz Powership Doğan Bey after Nuri Doğan Karadeniz, the COO of the company.

In May 2009, the Sedef Shipyard in Tuzla, Istanbul, was commissioned with the task to convert a cargo ship into a Powership by installing the needed engine-generators, transformers, and the electric switchboards on board.

Karadeniz Powership Doğan Bey is the first of its kind, a Powership with dual-fuel diesel engines capable of operating on natural gas as well. Aboard the vessel, twelve 10.53 MW generator units are installed. Three units are present in each one of the ship's four holds, with the fans and funnels being mounted on deck.

Bureau Veritas, an international certification agency with experience in overseeing both shipbuilding and power plant development, classified the vessel following its conversion as a "special service-floating power plant".

Operations 
Karpowership has offices and is operational in Africa, Americas, Asia, Europe and the Middle East. Karpowership's International Projects operate out of Istanbul, from where they can supply floating power plants to overseas locations.

Ships 
Karadeniz Powership Doğan Bey (IMO 8117031), 126 MW, 2010, served in Basra, Iraq, now serving in Sierra Leone.
Karadeniz Powership Rauf Bey (IMO 7925522), 179 MW, 2010, served in Basra, Iraq, now serving in Sudan.
MV Karadeniz Powership Kaya Bey (IMO 7925546), 216 MW, 2011, served in Pakistan, served in Basra, Iraq.
Karadeniz Powership Alican Bey, 104 MW, 2011, served in Pakistan.
Karadeniz Powership İrem Sultan (IMO 8222252), 114 MW, 2012, served in Basra, Iraq, now serving in Nacala, Mozambique.
Karadeniz Powership Fatmagül Sultan, 202 MW, 2013, serving in Beirut, Lebanon.
Karadeniz Powership Orhan Bey (IMO 7942582), 202 MW, 2013, serving in Beirut, Lebanon.
Karadeniz Powership Esra Sultan, 235 MW, 2015, served in Tema, Ghana. now serving in Beirut, Lebanon.
Karadeniz Powership Zeynep Sultan (IMO 8116051), 125 MW, 2015, serving in Amurang, Indonesia
MV Karadeniz Powership Osman Khan (IMO 9189158), 470 MW, 2016, serving in Tema, Ghana.
MV Karadeniz Powership Onur Sultan (IMO 9248514), 470 MW, 2016, serving in Belawan, Indonesia.
MV Karadeniz Powership Gökhan Bey (IMO 9214563), 125 MW, 2016, serving in Kupang, Indonesia.
MV Karadeniz Powership Yasin Bey (IMO 9214551), 125 MW, 2016, serving in Ambon, Indonesia.
MV Karadeniz Powership Mehmet Bey (IMO 9232785), 126 MW, 2018, serving in Indonesia.
MV Karadeniz Powership Nezih Bey (IMO 9034781), 37 MW, 2018, serving in Ambon, Indonesia.
MV Karadeniz Powership Koray Bey (IMO 9086203), 36 MW, 2018, serving in Gambia.
Karadeniz Powership Baris Bey (IMO 9166546), 36 MW Seal Class, 2019, to serve in Cuba.

Corruption allegations 

Karpowership and its parent company Karadeniz have faced corruption allegations in several countries. In Lebanon, Karadeniz is accused of corruption and faces a potential $25-million fine.

In Pakistan, a Karadeniz subsidiary allegedly paid middlemen to secure a $565 million government contract. The Supreme Court voided the contract in 2012 and launched a corruption investigation. It was resolved in 2019 through political negotiations between Pakistan and Turkey.

In April 2021, the Department of Mineral Resources and Energy in South Africa entered into a 20-year power supply agreement with Karpowership to address the ongoing energy crisis. Accusations of corruption in the tendering process have led to legal challenges and ongoing judicial inquiry. On 1 August 2022, the Minister of Forestry, Fisheries and the Environment denied the appeal by the South African subsidiary to continue their project to deploy 3 ships with a total capacity of 1220 MW due to lack of consultation, unconvincing environmental reports and "questioned the need and desirability of the proposed project". The minister has allowed the company 180 days to address gaps and defects in their submission for reconsideration.

References

Powerships
Companies based in Istanbul